Jagathgiri Gutta is a Colony and a Municipal Division (Division 125)in Quthbullapur assembly Constituency in Hyderabad in Telangana state of India.

Ranga Reddy district